3 A.M. is a 2014 Hindi horror directed by Vishal Mahadkar, the film stars Rannvijay Singh, Anindita Nayar, Salil Acharya and Kavin Dave. The film released on 26 September 2014.

Plot
The movie starts with few students trespassing on a haunted place called "Rudra Mills", where they are stopped by Sunny to go further into the premises. Sunny then narrates his story to them. He starts by narrating about his fiancée Sarah who used to do programmes on haunted places and while once she was unable to find her Bhagwad Gita, so she unwillingly had to leave for her show without it. At around midnight, Sunny woke up to see Sarah crying and on being asked what happened, Sarah says,"I am sorry" before vanishing away. While confused, Sunny receives a call from police informing him about the death of Sarah, who was found hanged from the walls of Rudra Mills which was deemed as a haunted place.

After this, sometime later, Sunny proposes a show to his producer for permission to shoot for paranormal activities in order to prove the existence of ghosts and spirits. The producer approves of the program, and Sunny chooses Rudra Mills as the site for the first show. Raj and Cyrus accompany him to the show being sad over the death of Sarah. They both set cameras at different places and are successful in finding very powerful paranormal activity. They experience scary activities around them by the very night at different spots .At 3 a.m., Cyrus is possessed by the powerful demonic spirit of Rudra Pratap Singh, the owner of Rudra Mills. He chases after the two and separates them after which he kills Raj in some sort of ritual. Sunny, enraged by the Raj's death, taunts Rudra Pratap to face him. They battle with each other and Sunny is able to defeat him, mortally wounding himself in the process. He comes outside bleeding and reaches for the main gate which is locked. He lies down for some time and sees the officials coming in. He goes after them, but they cannot see him or hear him. While asking them for help, he passes right through them and sees himself lying dead beneath a tree. Story is conducted by Sunny telling the story to college students. Finally the fact that Sunny was dead all the time by fighting against the evil spirit of Rudra Pratap Singh and that his spirit was narrating the story to the students is revealed.

They don't believe that he is dead. He eventually tells them to leave the premises and reunites with his wife "who was dead". The students are left frightened and mesmerized as they disappear proving that paranormal activities really do exist...

The movie ends on a note "The End (Is just a beginning)".

Cast
Rannvijay Singh as Sunny
Anindita Nayar as Sarah
Salil Acharya as Cyrus
Kavin Dave as Raj

Music
The music of the film was composed by Mannan, Raeth band, Bruno 
and Pranay Rijia.

Reception
India TV gave the film 3 out 5 stars, writing "The film is a sharp slick scare-fest. It delivers the fear quotient without resorting to cheap gimmicks or excessive gore."

Kaushani Banerjee in her negative review for Deccan Chronicle stated "Although the film has a few good songs to its credit, but the force injection of commercial factors and resorting to Bollywood’s ideas of horror movies, makes '3AM' another mediocre attempt. You can watch '3AM' but there is nothing new, nothing great or nothing specific to recommend it for." Tushar Joshi in his two star review for DNA stated "If you can settle for an average supernatural thriller then 3 A.M. won't disappoint you."

References

External links
 

Hindi-language horror films
2014 films
Indian horror films
2010s Hindi-language films